Hobey Baker Memorial Rink is a 2,092-seat hockey arena in Princeton, New Jersey. It is home to the Princeton University Tigers men's and women's ice hockey teams as well as the venue for club and intramural hockey teams, intramural broomball, figure skating and recreational skating. It is the only ice skating rink on the Princeton University campus.  It is named in honor of former Princeton star Hobart A.H. "Hobey" Baker, '14.  Baker was a football and hockey star who died shortly after World War I.  In December 1921, it was decided to build an on-campus arena for the hockey team, and to name it after Baker.  Efforts to modernize the arena began in the mid-1970s with major improvements including the addition of locker rooms, a skate sharpening room and a stick storage room in 1981, a new scoreboard and lighting improvements in 1984 and a renovation of the roof in 2002.  It is the second-oldest arena still in use in NCAA Division I hockey, behind only Matthews Arena at Northeastern University; however, Northeastern has only played at Matthews Arena since 1930, giving Princeton the distinction of being the school that has played in its current home the longest.

See also
Hobey Baker Award

References

External links
 Entry at Princeton athletics site
 RinkAtlas listing for Baker Rink at Princeton University

College ice hockey venues in the United States
Indoor ice hockey venues in the United States
Sports venues in New Jersey
Baker Rink
Princeton Tigers men's basketball
1923 establishments in New Jersey
Sports venues completed in 1923